Florence Helen Woolward (1854 Hammersmith – 3 January 1936) was an English botanical illustrator and author, and was commissioned by Schomberg Kerr, 9th Marquess of Lothian to paint his extensive orchid collection, and published in parts between 1891 and 1896 as "The Genus Masdevallia".

Biography 
Woolward was a freelance artist and the daughter of Reverend Woolward. She lived in Belton, Lincolnshire and through the Talbot Sisters was commissioned by Schomberg to paint orchids and fungi from Newbattle Abbey and Monteviot House. She received no formal training as artist or botanist, but on completion of the project for Schomberg, she worked at the Natural History museum.

"The Genus Masdevallia" is considered one of the finest illustrated orchid books of the Victorian age. The Marquess had a passion for orchids, in particular the Andean Masdevallias of which he had a sizeable collection at Newbattle Abbey in Scotland. Most of these came from Friedrich Carl Lehmann, who was a regular advertiser in the pages of "The Gardeners' Chronicle". Pressed flowers from Newbattle Abbey are still preserved at the Natural History Museum. Spending some ten years on visits to Newbattle Abbey, Woolward depicted more than 350 orchids, of which 85 were Masdevallias.

After having problems in finding a professional botanist to write the text accompanying each plate, Woolward decided to write it herself and the work appeared in nine parts between 1891 and 1896, each part with ten plates and text, the final part having only seven plates. The parts were priced at £1 10s each, a total of £13 10s for the set. Each species has detailed notes on its habitat in the Andes, and these were written by Lehmann. Some of his original, hand-written descriptions are in possession of his family in Popayán, as well as a letter from Woolward. The plates were lithographed by Florence herself – the hand-coloured plates depict all the Masdevallia species at life-size. Originally 250 copies were planned, but it appears that only 150 were actually issued, with 100 being bound. In the introduction Woolward writes of her involvement in the book's preparation: "It is no doubt advantageous in botanical work … that the person who makes the original drawing from nature should also lithograph the plates and indicate the colours to be used by the colorist, for, by this means, the work passes through fewer hands and is more likely to turn out accurate. I have therefore pursued this method throughout the present work, and have, besides, touched up the colouring of every plate sent out, numbering nearly 9,000"

Bound volumes of Woolward's paintings of orchids and fungi remain with the heirs of the Marquess. Her later works for the Natural History Museum are showpieces of draughtsmanship and botanical accuracy. Her work on elms and poplars concluded in about 1908, and her landscapes somewhat earlier. From then, it would appear, that she produced no further works.

After publication of "The Genus Masdevallia" some original plates remained in the possession of the Woolward family, but their whereabouts remained unknown. They were finally found in the care of two of Woolward's great nieces living on the Welsh Borders. The contents of an old trunk included not only the plates, but also "framed photographs, hand-painted china, and memorabilia". The folio of paintings was donated to Royal Botanic Gardens, Kew, joining Woolward's original vignettes which had been donated to Kew by Rev. Spenser A. Woolward in 1937.

Letter from Woolward to Friedrich Carl Lehmann

External links
 
 Download from The Internet Archive of "The Genus Masdevallia"

References

1854 births
1936 deaths
19th-century English painters
19th-century English women artists
20th-century English painters
20th-century English women artists
Botanical illustrators
British botanists
English women painters
Painters from London
People from Hammersmith
Women botanists